The Kamzík TV Tower is a  tall television transmission tower in the Koliba area of Bratislava, the capital of Slovakia. The tower lies within the territory of the Bratislava Forest Park. It was constructed in 1975, replacing a previous transmission tower. The tower was designed by architects Stanislav Májek, Jakub Tomašák, Juraj Kozák, Milan Jurica and Ján Privitzer.

The tower has a public observation deck. In conditions of good visibility, Austria, Hungary and the Czech Republic are visible from the tower.

Restaurant

The VEŽA restaurant closed in May 2010 due to a lack of customers. The restaurant's chefs and staff moved to the West Restaurant at the Best Western West Hotel about  down the tower approach road.

In 2011, a new restaurant named Altitude opened with an updated interior, serving Mediterranean cuisine. The restaurant is divided into an observation cafe bar, another restaurant, Brasseria, on one floor and the main restaurant on the floor below with rotating tables which provide a 360-degree panoramic view.

FM radio

Television

 DVB-T

See also
List of towers

References

External links
 Kamzík TV Tower at skyscraperpage.com
 Kamzík TV Tower images at flickr
 http://www.solideurope.sk/TV_stanice.htm 
 http://www.radia.sk/vysielace/4_bratislava-kamzik.html

Towers completed in 1975
Observation towers in Slovakia
Transmitter sites in Slovakia
Buildings and structures in Bratislava
Towers with revolving restaurants
Restaurants in Slovakia
Radio masts and towers in Europe
Observation towers